Augusta Savage House and Studio is a historic home and sculpture studio located at Saugerties in Ulster County, New York, United States.  The house is a simple mid-19th century two story, timber-frame gabled-el style Greek Revival dwelling. The sculpture studio is a small, single story, shed roofed building.  The property was owned by sculptor Augusta Savage (1892–1962) from 1945 to 1962.

It was listed on the National Register of Historic Places in 2001.

References

Houses on the National Register of Historic Places in New York (state)
Houses in Ulster County, New York
Greek Revival houses in New York (state)
Saugerties, New York
National Register of Historic Places in Ulster County, New York